Sam Bradford Boyd (August 12, 1914 – June 8, 2001) was an American football player and coach.  He served as the head football coach of the Baylor University from 1956 to 1958, compiling a record of 15–15–1.  His 1956 squad finished a 9–2 season with a win over Tennessee in the Sugar Bowl. Boyd played college football at Baylor from 1936 to 1938 and with the Pittsburgh Steelers of the National Football League (NFL) in 1939 and 1940.  Boyd served in the United States Navy for three years during World War II attaining the rank of lieutenant. In 1962, he was inducted into Baylor's Athletic Hall of Fame.  Boyd died on June 8, 2001, at his home in Granbury, Texas.

Head coaching record

See also
 List of NCAA major college football yearly receiving leaders

References

External links
 
 

1914 births
2001 deaths
American football ends
Baylor Bears football coaches
Baylor Bears football players
Pittsburgh Steelers players
United States Navy officers
United States Navy personnel of World War II
People from Granbury, Texas
People from Rockwall, Texas
Coaches of American football from Texas
Players of American football from Texas
Military personnel from Texas